The 1938 Pau Grand Prix was a motor race held on 10 April 1938 at the Pau circuit, in Pau, Pyrénées-Atlantiques, France. The Grand Prix was won by René Dreyfus, driving the Delahaye 145. Rudolf Caracciola and Hermann Lang combined to finish second and Gianfranco Comotti finished third.

Classification

Race

References

Pau Grand Prix
1938 in French motorsport